Dankovsky Uyezd (Данковский уезд) was one of the subdivisions of the Ryazan Governorate of the Russian Empire. It was situated in the southwestern part of the governorate. Its administrative centre was Dankov.

Demographics
At the time of the Russian Empire Census of 1897, Dankovsky Uyezd had a population of 105,746. Of these, 99.8% spoke Russian and 0.1% Romani as their native language.

References

 
Uezds of Ryazan Governorate
Ryazan Governorate